Lee Se-mi is a South Korean actress, model, singer and host. She was also a member of girls group LPG. She is also known for her roles in dramas and movies, she appeared in drama Terms of Endearment and she also appeared in movies such as The Romantic President and Attack the Gas Station 2.

Personal life
She married Min Woo-hyuk who is an actor, model and singer. She and Min Woo-hyuk married in 2012 in Seoul. She left the Entertainment Industry in 2013 then she returned. She does hosting and advertisements. She has two children a son and daughter.

Discography

Filmography

Television series

Film

References

External links 
 
 

1984 births
Living people
21st-century South Korean actresses
South Korean female models
South Korean television actresses
South Korean film actresses